Group 6 of the UEFA Euro 1972 qualifying tournament was one of the eight groups to decide which teams would qualify for the UEFA Euro 1972 finals tournament. Group 6 consisted of four teams: Italy, Austria, Sweden, and Republic of Ireland, where they played against each other home-and-away in a round-robin format. The group winners were Italy, who finished three points above Austria.

Final table

Matches

Goalscorers

References
 
 
 

Group 6
1970–71 in Italian football
1971–72 in Italian football
1970–71 in Austrian football
1971–72 in Austrian football
1970 in Swedish football
1971 in Swedish football
1970–71 in Northern Ireland association football
1971–72 in Northern Ireland association football